Mahendra Bahadur Bista (born 21 April 1949) is a Nepali politician and scientist. He has held the position of director general of the government's Department of Health (DOH) and the director of Nepal's Epidemiological and Disease Control Division position implementing modern maternity care and disease control in rural parts of the country. He is the nephew of Ratna Bahadur Bista.

References 

Nepalese politicians
People from Dadeldhura District
1949 births
Living people